Nesiosphaerion is a genus of beetles in the family Cerambycidae, containing the following species:

 Nesiosphaerion caymanensis (Fisher, 1948)
 Nesiosphaerion charynae Lingafelter, 2008
 Nesiosphaerion insulare (White, 1853)
 Nesiosphaerion testaceum (Fisher, 1932)

References

Elaphidiini